Ocean Networks Canada is a University of Victoria initiative that operates the NEPTUNE and VENUS cabled ocean observatories in the northeast Pacific Ocean and the Salish Sea. Additionally, Ocean Networks Canada operates smaller community-based observatories offshore from Cambridge Bay, Nunavut., Campbell River, Kitamaat Village and Digby Island. These observatories collect data on physical, chemical, biological, and geological aspects of the ocean over long time periods. As with other ocean observatories such as ESONET, Ocean Observatories Initiative, MACHO and DONET, scientific instruments connected to Ocean Networks Canada are operated remotely and provide continuous streams of freely available data to researchers and the public.  Over 200 gigabytes of data are collected every day.

The VENUS Observatory is situated at three main sites in the Salish Sea, including Saanich Inlet (depth 100 m), the eastern and central Strait of Georgia (depths 170–300 m), and the Fraser River delta.

The NEPTUNE observatory is situated off the west coast of Vancouver Island in Barkley Sound, along the Cascadia subduction zone, on the Cascadia Basin abyssal plain, and on the Endeavour segment of the  Juan de Fuca Ridge.

Altogether, the system includes 3 observatories, 5 shore stations, 850+ km of seafloor backbone cables, 11 instrumented sites, 32 instrument platforms, 6 mobile instrument platforms, 400+ instruments and over 2000 scientific sensors deployed.

Scientific topics of study that are enabled by data from these observatories include Arctic oceanography, deep-sea biodiversity, marine ecosystem function, marine forensics, gas hydrates, hydrothermal vents, marine mammals, sediment and benthic dynamics and tsunami studies.

Study sites 
Ocean Networks Canada instrumentations are installed in the following seafloor locations:

Salish Sea

Saanich Inlet 

Saanich Inlet, at the southern end of Vancouver Island, Canada, is a naturally hypoxic basin. A shallow sill (70 m) at the mouth isolates the deep basin (215 m) that experiences seasonal deep-water anoxia as a result of high primary productivity and subsequent degradation of sedimented organic matter. The Saanich Inlet network consists of cabled arrays of instruments in Mill Bay, Patricia Bay and an autonomous mooring at the entrance (sill) to the inlet. Two cabled surface buoys are connected to the Patricia Bay installation, supporting a technology testbed facility (Patricia Bay) and a full water column observation station (Coles Bay). Patricia Bay installations include:
 Seafloor network at 100 m depth connected to a shore station at the Institute of Ocean Sciences
 Surface buoy based Ocean Technology Testbed designed and built to support engineering and technology development.
 Surface based Buoy Profiling System (BPS) designed and built for water column measurements off Coles Bay in central Saanich Inlet.
 Autonomous Underwater Vehicle ("Bluefin")

In Mill Bay, a mini-observatory is installed at Brentwood College with basic sensors that measure water properties at 8 m depth.

Strait of Georgia 

A network with three sites on seafloor at Central, East and Fraser Delta locations of the southern Strait of Georgia, and surface-based systems on BC Ferries, Iona Causeway, and Coal Port terminal. Installations in the Strait of Georgia include:
 Seafloor networks linking 3 nodes at 300 m (Central), 175 m (East), and 170 m (Fraser Delta)
 Shore-based High Frequency radar (CODAR with 2 antennas)
 Instrumentation on BC Ferries vessels ("Seekeeper")
 Ocean glider (Webb "Slocum")

Northeast Pacific

Barkley Canyon 
Barkley Canyon extends from the continental shelf edge at 400 m down the continental slope to the canyon axis at 985 m water depth. Located at the leading edge of the Cascadia subduction zone, this site supports the study of the accretionary prism, where the sediments pile along the continental slope as they are scraped off the subducting or descending tectonic plate. This is also a location where pressure, temperature, gas saturation, and local biological and chemical conditions are just right for exposed gas hydrates to be stable on the seafloor. Gas hydrates have gas molecules, typically methane in marine environments, trapped within “cages” of water molecules. This gives them a crystalline structure that resembles ice and can appear as white to yellow mounds covered by sediment on the seafloor.

The region is influenced by a major ocean current system. Off the coast, the west wind drift current splits to create the Alaska and the California currents (the California current system). The direction and strength of the currents regulate the upwelling/downwelling regime along the coast, with a flow towards the equator in summer (California current) and reversal in winter (Alaska current). In addition to these two currents, a large submarine canyon acts as a primary conduit for the transfer of sediment from the continental slope to the deep-sea.

Organisms living in the depths of Barkley Canyon have evolved to be able to persist in areas with high pressure, no light, and low nutrients/food availability. The Barkley Canyon instruments span a diversity of habitats, each of which is associated with its own specialized biological community. Most of the areas within Barkley Canon are characterised by a soft, finely sedimented seafloor. Video observations suggest that animal densities are higher at the shallower sites compared with the deeper sites, although most species are present at all sites. A number of fish including sablefish, thornyheads, rockfish, flatfish, sharks, skates, hagfish and eelpouts have been observed throughout Barkley Canyon. The area is rich with invertebrates as well including molluscs (bivalves, octopus, snails), echinoderms (sea stars, brittle stars, sea cucumbers, and urchins) as well as arthropods (crabs and shrimp). Cnidarians are seen both on the seafloor (anemones, sea pens, and corals) as well as floating in the water column (jellyfish) along with other organisms such as salps, ctenophores, and tunicates.

Where gas hydrates are observed on the seafloor, there are mats of chemosynthetic bacteria which derive their energy from hydrogen sulphide produced by the oxidate of methane by a second group of microbes living deep within the sediments. Other chemosynthetic sulphide-oxidizing bacteria live in symbiosis with clams who live at these hydrate mounts. Many of the species observed elsewhere in Barkley Canyon are not dependent on this system but are frequently observed in the area.

Cascadia Basin 

The Cascadia Basin is the heavily sediment part of the Juan de Fuca Plate that extends from the base the continental margin to the west where the sediments lap on to the Juan de Fuca Ridge flank. The Juan de Fuca Plate is one of the last remnants of the Farallon Plate, the original eastern Pacific oceanic plate, which has been almost entirely subducted beneath North America. The flat sediment surface constitutes an abyssal plain, an exceedingly vast environment that covers over 50% of the planet’s surface. Seemingly inhospitable, with temperatures below 2 °C, high-pressures, and a total absence of light, the Cascadia Basin is nevertheless home to an assortment of well-adapted organisms.

Depending mostly on marine snow—the continuous shower of mostly organic detritus falling from surface waters—little is known about the complicated food web connecting the organisms of the deep. Because of the harsh environment, there is a low density of organisms observed. Despite the low density, there is a fairly diverse community living on the abyssal plain. Installation and maintenance work has enabled a number of these organisms to be observed. The main groups of organisms observed include fish (skates and rattails), echinoderms (sea cucumbers, sea stars, brittle stars, and crinoids), molluscs (octopus and squid), sea pens, crabs, and squat lobsters. A number of pelagic (living in the water column) organisms were observed such as squid, jellyfish, ostracods, ctenophores, and salps.

A few isolated outcropping seamounts that pierce through more than 200 m of impermeable sediments, are conduits that allow hydrologic exchange between the open ocean and the upper oceanic crust—the largest aquifer of the planet. The Cascadia Basin site is placed in the vicinity of several circulation obviation retrofit kit (CORK) borehole observatories, which are designed to study the hydrology, geochemistry and microbiology of the upper oceanic crust. CORKs are also being used to investigate changes in regional plate strain that are caused by earthquakes on the plate boundaries. The seafloor pressure measurements of the CORK borehole observatories constitute the center of a “tsunami-meter”, a network of several high precision, rapid sampling bottom pressure recorders (BPRs), that allows precise determination of deep water tsunami amplitude, direction of propagation, and speed.

Clayoquot Slope 
The name Clayoquot (pronounced “Clah-quot”) is an anglicized version of Tla-o-qui-aht, the largest nation in the Nuu-chah-nulth (Nootka) First Nations, whose people have resided in the Clayoquot Sound region near Tofino and Ucluelet for at least the last 2000 years. The Clayoquot Slope site lies about 1250 m below sea level and approximately 20 km landward of the toe of the Cascadia subduction zone. The Cascadia subduction zone is the area at which the Juan de Fuca plate is subducting (descending) beneath the North American plate. This is a zone where much of the thick layer of sediments deposited on the eastern flank of the Juan de Fuca Ridge are scraped off and accreted as the tectonic plates converge (move together). As sediments thicken and compact from accretion, pore waters are expelled from the sediment, and gases — primarily biogenic methane — contribute to the formation of gas hydrates in the upper few hundred metres of the sediment. At this site, a cold vent, known as Bullseye Vent, has formed along with significant concentrations of gas hydrates.

Clayoquot Slope is home to a variety of deep-sea organisms. Many demersal fish (fish which live very near the bottom) were observed (rockfish, flatfish, thorny heads, and rattails) along with echinoderms (sea cucumbers, brittle stars, sea stars), octopus, crabs, cnidarians (sea pens, corals, anemones), and bacterial mats. In the water column, organisms such as squid, krill, jellyfish, siphonophores, and larvaceans have been observed during installation and maintenance work.

Endeavour 

Endeavour (depth 2200–2400 m) is a northern segment of the Juan de Fuca Ridge which, in turn, is part of the complex, 80,000 km long mid-ocean ridge system spanning the World Ocean. Juan de Fuca Ridge is a medium rate spreading centre (~6 cm/yr) forming the divergent boundary between the Pacific (to the west) and the Juan de Fuca (to the east) tectonic plates . At these divergent boundaries, convection currents in the mantle rise up as magma, emerge through the rifts as lava, and crystallise as new rock (basalts and gabbro). These processes continually create new ocean crust. Hydrothermal vents, which typically form along these mid-ocean ridges, are fissures from which geothermally heated water flows. The water flowing out of vents is dominantly seawater drawn into the system through the faults, porous sediments, and volcanic rocks. As the cool seawater moves through the sediment and rock towards the hot magma, the water becomes super heated (300-400 °C) and rich in dissolved mineral elements (such as sulphur, iron, zinc and copper) from the young ocean crust. When the hot effluent is expelled, it encounters the cold, ambient seawater (about 2 °C) minerals precipitate from the element-rich vent water. At the Endeavour segment, a notably vigorous venting area, black smokers form at the high temperature vents, where the effluent is precipitating iron sulphides. This gives the plumevits dark colour and deposits sulphide-minerals, creating chimneys up to 30 m in height. There are 6 known vent fields with distinct morphologies spaced about 2 km apart along the axial rift valley of the segment.

These tall sulphide chimneys (hydrothermal vents) host some unique ecological communities. While most of the deep sea depends on near-surface productivity with photosynthesis as its fundamental energy source, vent communities are completely independent from the surface and sunlight. Bacteria are able to use reduced compounds from the vent effluent as an energy source (chemosynthesis). These bacteria can be free-living or symbiotic and are the base of the food web of these communities where 90% of the species are endemic to this special environment. The tubeworm Ridgeia piscesae grows in large colonies in diffuse venting areas, supported by the symbiotic chemosynthetic bacteria developing in their cells. These worms have no mouth and rely on their internal symbiotic bacteria to survive. Other species living within hydrothermal communities include limpets, worms (scale worms and sulphide worms), fish, and sea spiders.

Folger Passage 

Folger Passage is located at the mouth of Barkley Sound, offshore Vancouver Island near Bamfield, British Columbia. The seafloor composition includes cobble, gravel, soft sandy sediment, and carbonate-rich detritus. Two instrument platforms, Folger Deep (100 m) and Folger Pinnacle (23 m), are installed at Folger Passage. Folger Deep is situated on soft sediment at the mouth of an inlet channel while the Folger Pinnacle platform is secured to the top of a rocky reef within a rockfish conservation area.

This coastal zone is ideal for studies of land-ocean interactions and coastal physical oceanography. Estuarine circulation from Barkley Sound is influenced by the shelf dynamics of an eastern boundary current, creating a complex physical environment. Surface outflow drives a deep water inflow which is strongly influenced by upwelling and downwelling conditions on the nearby continental shelf. The nutrient-rich, terrestrial freshwater discharge and the nutrient-rich, cool, salty upwelled water support a diverse and abundant ecosystem

Folger Pinnacle, located atop a shallow reef, has dense mats of sponges, ascidians and encrusting algae. There are numerous types of sessile (bottom attached) organisms including sponges, anemones, bryozoans, tunicates, and barnacles. Since this is a rockfish conservation area, there is a wide variety of rockfish (yellowtail, China, quillback, Puget Sound, black, and blue) in addition to many other fish (kelp greenling, lingcod, flatfish, wolfeels), molluscs (giant Pacific octopus, mussels, swimming scallops, and snails), and echinoderms (seastars, sea cucumbers, and urchins). An echosounder installed at Folger Deep shows evidence of a dense zooplankton community and schools of fish in the water column, while hydrophones regularly record the songs of whales and dolphins in the area.

Notes

References 
 
 
 
 
 
 
 
 
 Juniper, S. K., S. D. McLean, B. Pirenne, R. M. Flagg, and A. O. Bui (2014), First Results from a Real-Time Cabled Observatory in the Canadian Arctic Ocean, in Ocean Sciences Meeting 2014, Ocean Sciences Meetings, Honolulu. [online] Available from: http://www.sgmeet.com/osm2014/viewabstract.asp?AbstractID=17329
 
 
 
 Matabos, M., M. Best, J. Blandin, M. Hoeberechts, S. K. Juniper, B. Pirenne, K. Robert, H. Ruhl, and M. Varadaro (2012), Seafloor Observatories, in Biological Sampling in the Deep Sea, edited by M. Consalvey and M. Clark, Wiley-Blackwell publishing.
 
 
 Riedel, M., and E. C. Willoughby (2010), Gas hydrates - Geophysical exploration techniques and methods, in Geophysical Characterization of Gas Hydrates, edited by M. Riedel, E. C. Willoughby, and S. Chopra, pp. 1–13, Society of Exploration Geophysicists, Tulsa. [online] Available from: http://www.seg.org/c/document_library/get_file?uuid=0e72d3c0-9535-4e8f-bb94-8dd25b5ca36c&groupId=10161
 
 Scherwath, M., G. Spence, M. Riedel, and M. Heesemann (2012), Gas Release Near Bullseye Vent - New Observations From NEPTUNE Canada"s Seafloor Cable, in Fall Meeting, AGU, p. OS43A–1794, American Geophysical Union, San Francisco.
 Wang, C., and R. Pawlowicz (2014), High Spatial and Temporal Resolution Oxygen Measurements in the Strait of Georgia and Their Relationship to Primary Production, in Ocean Sciences Meeting 2014, Honolulu. [online] Available from: http://www.sgmeet.com/osm2014/viewabstract.asp?AbstractID=14626

External links 

 Map Collection on Flickr

Oceanographic organizations
Organizations based in Victoria, British Columbia
Pacific Ocean
Research institutes established in 2007
Research projects